Ptocheuusa sublutella is a moth of the family Gelechiidae. It was described by Hugo Theodor Christoph in 1873. It is found in southern European Russia.

The length of the forewings is about 5 mm. The forewings are ochreous yellow with white veins and markings and some fine dispersed black atoms. The hindwings are shining grey.

References

Moths described in 1873
Ptocheuusa